William Gamble (5 August 1805 – 20 March 1881) was a Canadian businessman and pioneer. He was the son of the politician John Gamble and brother of John William Gamble, and was born in Kingston, Upper Canada. He started a store in Toronto before becoming a miller in Etobicoke. 

His business interests expanded to include a hotel, a distillery and shipping to transport his flour, as well as local crops, to Toronto. After 1835 he also became involved in developing Mimico and given right to King's Mill. He was active in building new roads and bridges, opening up territory for development. Flood damage by the Humber River in 1850, and the repeal of the British Corn Laws in 1849 (bringing a dramatic fall in the price of his flour) caused his milling business to collapse, but his reputation as a business leader endured and he was active in the foundation of the Bank of Toronto in 1855. The last remnants of his milling business fell out of his hands in 1862 when his mortgage was foreclosed, leaving him on the cusp of bankruptcy.

He also served on the York Board of Health (appointed 1833), as a director of the Bank of Upper Canada (appointed 1829 – ironically it was this bank that foreclosed his mortgage in 1862) and the British America Fire and Life Assurance Company (appointed 1834), as a Justice of the Peace (from 1842), and as the warden of St George’s-on-the-Hill, an Anglican church in Islington for which he donated the land in 1846, in two spells, from 1846 to 1848 and from 1851 to 1852.

Marriage

He married Elizabeth Bowles Brenchley on 10 December 1833. In 1838, they had a daughter, Janice. Gamble died in Toronto on 20 March 1881.

He is a member of the Etobicoke Hall of Fame.

External links 
Biography at the Dictionary of Canadian Biography Online

1805 births
1881 deaths
Canadian Anglicans
Pre-Confederation Canadian businesspeople
People from York, Upper Canada
Mayors of Etobicoke